Veitchia spiralis is a species of flowering plant in the family Arecaceae. It is found only in Vanuatu. It is threatened by habitat loss.

References

spiralis
Trees of Vanuatu
Near threatened plants
Endemic flora of Vanuatu
Taxonomy articles created by Polbot